Repaircare is a British company that specialises in repairs for brown and white goods. The company is based in the West Midlands and has a network of tradesmen that provide a repair service throughout England, Scotland and Wales.

History 

Repaircare was launched in 2002 to provide a repair service on behalf of manufacturers, high street retailers and insurance companies. The company experienced rapid growth in the early years and quickly became established as the largest independent ‘white goods’ work provider to the independent trade within the UK.

Since its foundation in 2002 repaircare has conducted over 200,000 white good repairs and in excess of 20,000 floorcare repairs.

In 2008 repaircare launched a home repair service, adding an extra dimension to the brand. This service enables people to get their domestic appliances that aren’t covered by a warranty, including washing machines, dishwashers and ovens, repaired for a fixed fee. The unique selling features of the repaircare service are the convenience of being able to book and arrange repairs online 24/7, and fixed pricing that include both parts and labour.

At present repaircare is one of a number of prominent players in the home repair market with approximate 6-8 week lead time on all repairs at £125 + £45 Administration.

As of November 2019, the company has an aggregate review score of 1.2/5 on the review aggregator site www.reviews.co.uk

Operations 

The repaircare head office is based in Birmingham, UK. They use a network of over 500 independent tradesmen to cover all regions of England, Scotland and Wales.

Repaircare specialise in domestic appliances and offer repairs on models from a number of the leading white and brown goods manufacturers including Hotpoint, Beko, Indesit, Dyson and Zanussi.

External links
Official site

References

Service companies of the United Kingdom
Business services companies established in 2002
Companies based in Birmingham, West Midlands
Small Heath, Birmingham
2002 establishments in England
British companies established in 2002